Blaue Wimpel im Sommerwind is an East German documentary film about the meeting of the Ernst Thälmann Pioneer Organization in Dresden in 1952.

External links
 

1952 films
East German films
1950s German-language films
Films whose director won the Heinrich Greif Prize
1952 documentary films
1950s German films